Catholic Comprehensive School, Breul, is a Catholic secondary school for VMBO, HAVO, Atheneum and Gymnasium, near Zeist. It is one of the colleges founded by the Society of Jesus in the Netherlands, in 1831, and has undergone several moves since then.

History
The school began as a private, Catholic, boys boarding school in 1831 in Katwijk aan den Rijn and in 1842 became a work of the Jesuits. In 1928 it moved to The Hague and in 1946 to an estate in Breul, between Zeist and Driebergen. In 1953 a new building was built which still stands and displays the school's motto Mutua Fides (mutual trust).

Girls were admitted from 1966 and in 1968 it merged with other girl's and boy's schools, and has been growing ever since. The boarding school, which accommodated 150 boys, remained until 1981. The current school building opened in 1980. The last Jesuits retired from the faculty in the 1980s and since then the school has become more generic Christian.

The students have long been included on the committee that hires teachers and evaluates them before issuing further contracts, through Representation of Students in Appointment Procedures (VLIB). The practice has drawn the attention of the national press. The VLIB organizes an assessment of teachers in their first year, through surveys in three classes, in the first and second half of the school year. Based on the results of the second evaluation VLIB pupils provide advice to the rector on whether to grant tenure to the teacher.

 the school had about 1,600 students, of which 42% were in the first two years. The school was then controlled by an interim administration.

Alumni

Piet Aalberse member Lower House of the States General for the RKSP, Chairman House of Representatives, Minister, member Council of State, Minister of State
:nl:Vincent van der Burg, member of parliament for the Christian Democrats
:nl:Erik Brey, comedian
Eva de Goede, international hockey
Fedde le Grand, DJ
:nl:Haye van der Heyden, writer
:nl:Frank Houben, Queen's Commissioner in England
:nl:Philip Houben, (younger brother of Frank), Mayor of Maastricht
:nl:Erik Jurgens, party executive CSF, member of parliament for the PPR later PvdA, member Senate for the PvdA, professor of media law Limburg University, and Professor of Constitutional and Administrative Law Free University Amsterdam
Hans Kolfschoten, member Senate for RKSP, Justice Minister, Mayor of Eindhoven and later The Hague
:nl:Constant Kortmann, King's Commissioner (or Queen) of North Brabant
Benk Korthals, member of parliament for the VVD, Justice Minister and Balkenende cabinet Defense Minister
:nl:Harry van der Putt, cigar manufacturer, member of parliament for the RKSP, deceased in Bergen-Belsen
Jan de Quay, member Senate for RKSP and KVP, Minister, Prime Minister, Deputy Prime Minister, Commissioner of the King (or Queen) in North Brabant
:nl:Robert Regout, S.J., Jesuit, professor of international law and resistance fighter, died in Dachau
:nl:Gustave Ruijs, Beerenbrouck member, Lower House member Senate for KVP and RKSP
Charles den Tex, writer
Frans-Jozef van Thiel, member of parliament for the CSF, Chairman House of Representatives, Minister of Social Work
:nl:Everardus Wittert Highland (1875-1959), member of the RKSP, leader of the Catholic social movement
and various members of the following families:
:nl:Michiels van Kessenich
:nl:Ruys de Beerenbrouck
Brenninkmeijer

See also
 List of Jesuit schools
 List of Jesuit sites in the Netherlands

References

Defunct Jesuit schools
Secondary schools in the Netherlands
Educational institutions established in 1831
1831 establishments in the Netherlands
Christian schools in the Netherlands